Hunyuan County is a county under the administration of Datong City, in the northeast of Shanxi province, China.

History

During the Spring and Autumn Period of Chinese history, present-day Hunyuan County formed part of the Baidi state of Dai to the north of the Zhou Kingdom. It was conquered by the Zhao clan of Jin.

Pingshu was later merged with Guo County, which was placed in Hengshan Commandery. During the Jianwu Era of the Eastern Han, Guo County was renamed. During the Three Kingdoms, Wei restored the name Guo. This was changed to Guoshan County by the Northern Wei, who placed it under the administration of Si Prefecture. Under the Tang, it was placed in Yun Prefecture.

Climate

Landmarks
The 1,500-year-old Hanging Temple is an important and unique structure within the Datong area.

Demography
In 2010 the population of the district was 343,486 inhabitants.

See also
 Hanging Temple
 Mount Heng (Shanxi)

References

Citations

Bibliography
 www.xzqh.org 
 .
 
 .

County-level divisions of Shanxi
Datong